Ville di Fiemme is a comune (municipality) in the Province of Trentino in the Italian region Trentino-Alto Adige/Südtirol. It was established on 1 January 2020 with the merger of the municipalities of Carano, Daiano and Varena.

References

Cities and towns in Trentino-Alto Adige/Südtirol